The 1901–02 Colgate Raiders men's basketball team represented Colgate University during the 1901–02 college men's basketball season. The head coach was Ellery Huntington Sr. coaching the Raiders in his second season. The team had finished with an overall record of 7–2.

Schedule

|-

References

Colgate Raiders men's basketball seasons
Colgate
Colgate
Colgate